Theodore Odrach (February 13, 1912 – October 7, 1964), born Theodore Sholomitsky, was a Ukrainian writer of novels, short stories and memoirs.  He is generally known as the "writer of the Pinsk Marshes."

Early life
Odrach was born in Misiatichy, outside of Pinsk, Belarus, to an impoverished noble  family ("shliahta").   The youngest of several children, Odrach was extremely devoted to his mother. An unruly child, at the age of nine he was sent by Polish authorities who then controlled the area to a reform school for boys in Vilnius. His parents were never informed of his whereabouts and did not learn what had happened to him until years later. After serving his time, doing odd renovation jobs around town at the age of eighteen, Odrach enrolled in the Stefan Batory University (now Vilnius University), where he went on to earn a degree in ancient history and philosophy.

The family coat of arms depicts Hippocentaurus, and the family name dates back to the 16th century, when Grand Duchy of Lithuania was powerful. The Sholomitsky estate was located in a village Sholomichy, near Mysiatichy and Pinsk.

It is likely that T. Odrach was baptized in the Church of Saint Paraskeva in Misiatichy, which was founded in the 18th century. The polesian local word "odrach" means "meadows near the Styr river, to Misiatichy".

World War II
With the Soviet invasion of Vilnius in 1939, Odrach fled to his native Belarus, landing a position as teacher of a grammar school in Hliaby's village, after as headmaster of a grammar school in Soshna's village (near Pinsk). Denounced by the Soviets and briefly imprisoned, he then headed south to Ukraine (Volyn Oblast), where he edited several underground newspapers. Still pursued by the Soviets and ultimately forced into hiding, he changed his name from Sholomitsky to Odrach, and managed to escape to Slovakia by way of the Carpathian Mountains.

In the West
With the war's end, Odrach roamed around Europe for several years. In 1948, after meeting Klara Nagorski in Germany, the two moved to Manchester, England, where they married. They lived in Manchester approximately five years and worked as weavers in a linen factory. In 1953 both Odrach and his wife boarded an ocean liner and sailed for Canada. With the birth of their two daughters, Ruta and Erma, they settled into a Victorian-style house on a small, quiet residential street in Toronto. Working by day in a nearby printing house, at night Odrach returned home to focus on his writing. Odrach produced novels, short stories, and articles for local Ukrainian newspapers. As his books were banned in the Soviet Union, he depended on the small Western immigrant community for his readership. Odrach's major works were written in his Toronto home. Odrach suffered a fatal stroke in 1964.

Wave of Terror, detailing the horrors of living under Joseph Stalin, was Odrach's first novel to appear in English. It was published by Academy Chicago Publishers and was translated by his daughter, Erma Odrach.

Bibliography
 В Дорозі, 1955
 Щебетун, 1957
 Півстанок за Cелом, 1959
 Покинута Оселя, 1960
 На Непевному Грунті, 1962
 Вощадь, 1972 (published posthumously)
 Wave of Terror, 2008

References

External links
Academy Chicago Publishing
Brothers Judd

Celebrating T. Odrach's 100th anniversary in Belarus - Belarusian Radio Liberty
About Misiatichy - Media-Polesie

1912 births
1964 deaths
People from Pinsk District
People from Pinsky Uyezd
Ukrainian writers
Canadian male novelists
Canadian male short story writers
Vilnius University alumni
20th-century Canadian novelists
Ukrainian male writers
20th-century Canadian short story writers
20th-century Canadian male writers
Soviet emigrants to Canada